Octaazacubane  is a hypothetical explosive allotrope of nitrogen with formula N8, whose molecules have eight atoms arranged into a cube. (By comparison, nitrogen usually occurs as the diatomic molecule N2.)  It can be regarded as a cubane-type cluster, where all eight corners are nitrogen atoms bonded along the edges.  It is predicted to be a metastable molecule, in which despite the thermodynamic instability caused by bond strain, and the high energy of the N–N single bonds, the molecule remains kinetically stable for reasons of orbital symmetry.

Explosive and fuel
Octaazacubane is predicted to have an energy density (assuming decomposition into N2) of 22.9 MJ/kg, which is over 5 times the standard value of TNT. It has therefore been proposed (along with other exotic nitrogen allotropes) as an explosive, and as a component of high performance rocket fuel.  Its velocity of detonation is predicted to be 15,000 m/s, much (48.5%) more than octanitrocubane, the fastest known nonnuclear explosive.

A prediction for cubic gauche nitrogen energy density is 33 MJ/kg, exceeding octaazacubane by 44%, though a more recent one is of 10.22 MJ/kg, making it less than half of octaazacubane.

See also
 Tetranitrogen (Nitrogen allotrope with formula N4)
 Hexazine (Nitrogen allotrope with formula N6)
 Pentazole
 1,1′-Azobis-1,2,3-triazole
 1-Diazidocarbamoyl-5-azidotetrazole

References

External links

Explosive chemicals
Hypothetical chemical compounds
Allotropes of nitrogen